Mount Insel is the highest point in the northeastern part of the Insel Range, in Victoria Land, Antarctica. It was named by the Victoria University of Wellington Antarctic Expedition (1958–59) in association with the Insel Range.

References

Mountains of Victoria Land
McMurdo Dry Valleys